City Theatre may refer to:
 City Theatre (Detroit), Detroit, Michigan, United States
 City Theatre (Pittsburgh), Pittsburgh, Michigan, United States
 City Theatre, Sydney (1843–1845), Australia
 Altona City Theatre, Altona, Victoria, Australia
 Brno City Theatre, Brno, Czech Republic
 DBKL City Theatre, Kuala Lumpur, Malaysia
 Gothenburg City Theatre, Gothenburg, Sweden
 Helsingborg City Theatre, Helsingborg, Sweden
 Ljubljana City Theatre, Ljubljana, Slovenia
 Malmö City Theatre, Malmö, Sweden
 Oulu City Theatre, Oulu, Finland
 Reykjavik City Theatre, Reykjavik, Iceland
 SFX City Theatre, Dublin, Dublin, Ireland
 Stockholm City Theatre, Stockholm, Sweden